Donald "Don" MacDonald is a former politician from Alberta, Canada. He served in the Legislative Assembly of Alberta from 1992 to 1993.

Political career
MacDonald first ran for a seat to the Alberta Legislature in a by-election held on October 26, 1992, in the electoral district of Three Hills as a candidate of the Liberal Party. He won the district with 46% of the popular vote in a stunning upset.

A few months later, in the 1993 Alberta general election, MacDonald ran in the new electoral district of Three Hills-Airdrie as his old riding was abolished during redistribution. He was defeated by Progressive Conservative candidate Carol Haley by a wide margin.

In the 1997 Alberta general election, he ran under the Social Credit banner in the district of Olds-Didsbury-Three Hills. He finished second to Progressive Conservative candidate Richard Marz.

MacDonald holds the record for the shortest time served in the Alberta legislature between election and defeat, at seven months and 20 days.

References

External links
Legislative Assembly of Alberta Members Listing

Alberta Liberal Party MLAs
Living people
Year of birth missing (living people)